Afer may refer to:

 Afer, an individual of the Afri tribe after which the continent of Africa is probably named
 Afer, a Roman cognomen in reference to Africa, used by several people listed below; see also list of Roman cognomina
 Afer ventus, another name for Lips, the Roman deity of the southwest wind; see Anemoi
 The Afep pigeon (Columba unicincta)
 A song on the 1991 Enya album Shepherd Moons

As an acronym 
 Air Force Expeditionary Service Ribbon
 American Foundation for Equal Rights
 Association Française d'Epargne et de Retraite
  Feroviara Romana, the Romanian Railway Authority; see Rail transport in Romania

People 
 Antonius Guilelmus Amo Afer (1703–c.1759), alternate name for Anton Wilhelm Amo, Ghanaian-German academic
 Arnobius Afer (died 4th century), also Arnobius the Elder, Roman rhetorician in the province of Africa
 Domitius Afer (died 60), Roman orator
 Gaius Marius Victorinus Afer (4th century), also Gaius Marius Victorinus, Roman grammarian and rhetorician
 Publius Aelius Hadrianus Afer, father of the Roman emperor Hadrian
 Publius Terentius Afer (died 159 BC), Roman comic playwright better known as Terence

Scientific names of organisms 
All named because the species is native to Africa.
 Cinnyris afer, greater double-collared sunbird
 Euplectes afer, yellow-crowned bishop
 Francolinus afer, red-necked francolin
 Nilaus afer, brubru
 Orycteropus afer, aardvark
 Papyrocranus afer , reticulate knifefish
 Parus afer, southern grey tit, also classified as Melaniparus afer
 Ptilostomus afer, piapiac
 Turtur afer, blue-spotted wood dove
 Afer, a genus of gastropods in the family of true whelks (Buccinidae)